Slew may refer to:

Motion control 
 Slew (spacecraft), describes methods of changing the attitude of a spacecraft 
 Slewing, the rotation of an object around an axis
 Eigenvector slew, a particular method of calculating the rotation required for a specific desired change in attitude

People

Last name
 Jenny Slew (1719 – after 1765), Black American who sued for her freedom
 Jordan Slew (born 1992), English footballer

Nickname
 William Hester (1912–1993), American tennis player and official
 John S. McCain Sr. (1884–1945), United States Navy admiral

Race horses
 Seattle Slew (1974–2002), American Triple Crown winner in 1977
 Slew o' Gold (1980–2007), U.S. Three Year-old Male Champion in 1983
 Slewacide (1980–2000), broodmare sire of Funny Cide

Other uses
 Slew footing, an infraction in the sport of ice hockey
 Slew rate, the maximum rate of change of a signal at any point in a circuit
 The Slew, a multinational electronic music project

See also 
 
 
 Skew (disambiguation)
 Slough (disambiguation)